Nirvanna the Band the Show is a Canadian mockumentary television series based on the web series Nirvana the Band the Show, created by and starring Matt Johnson and Jay McCarrol. It premiered on February 2, 2017 on Viceland.

Premise
The show stars the duo as "Nirvanna the Band," two hapless lifelong best friends and roommates, who engage in a series of complex publicity stunts around their home city of Toronto in the hopes of landing a gig at The Rivoli, despite the fact that they have never actually written or recorded a single song, nor taken any other steps to get their band ready.

Production
The show is a combination of scripted scenes, candid camera footage of people unaware the show is being filmed, and improvisation. Often the show is influenced by events that happen in reality. For example, in the fifth episode, "The Big Time", creators Johnson and McCarrol used the premiere of Johnson's real life movie Operation Avalanche at the 2016 Sundance Film Festival to film an episode around the concept of the character Matt sneaking a fictional movie of the same name into the festival. In the same episode, a woman unaware of the show being filmed intrudes on a scripted conversation between Johnson and Kevin Smith (appearing as himself), offering Johnson alcohol, which inspired Johnson and McCarrol to include the concept of the character of Matt discovering a love of alcohol in the episode. The show frequently blends the line between fiction and reality in ways like these, with actors breaking character and characters breaking the fourth wall.

Originally created as web series between 2007 and 2009, it was later expanded into a full television series which premiered on Viceland on February 2, 2017. Three episodes were also screened at the 2016 Toronto International Film Festival as part of its Primetime program of television projects. The series was originally announced in 2016 as slated to air on City, but was later shifted to Viceland with City airing only the first episode as a preview special. The second season has not been picked up for broadcast outside of Canada, however is available for streaming in Australia via SBS On Demand. The show was formerly available to stream in the United Kingdom via Channel 4's streaming service All 4, along with other Viceland shows.

In August 2019, CBC Television officially acquired Nirvanna the Band the Show from Viceland and began airing the series, alongside streaming on CBC Gem.

The main characters, Matt and Jay, are based on characters McCarrol and Johnson started developing in high school in Mississauga. The title sequence for each episode is different, usually imitating the opening scenes or titles of other well-known film or television productions.

Episodes

Season 1 (2017)
{{Episode table
|background=#000000
|overall= 
|season=
|title=
|director=
|writer=
|airdate=
|country=US
|viewers=
|episodes=

{{Episode list
| EpisodeNumber = 5
| EpisodeNumber2 = 5
| Title = The Big Time
| DirectedBy = Matt Johnson
| WrittenBy = Andrew Appelle, Robert Hyland, Curt Lobb, Jay McCarrol, Matthew Miller, Jared Raab
| OriginalAirDate = 
| Viewers = 
| ShortSummary = After Matt is thrown out of a school for trying to film his movie, Operation Avalanche, without permission, Jay criticizes his constant use of deception in his plans, angering him. He secretly cuts Jay's part almost entirely and claims he got the film into the Sundance Film Festival. They travel to Park City, where Matt sneaks the film into the festival lineup and gains huge success because of it, and he publicly denounces Jay during interviews. As Jay wanders the city dejected, Matt gets his first taste of alcohol and Jay soon finds him passed out on the street just as the festival calls Matt's phone. Jay pretends to be Matt at Operation Avalanches official premiere until Matt shows up, who realizes the hurt he has caused Jay and invites him to introduce the movie together until they realize that audiences hate it.Opening Title:''' Entourage| LineColor = 000000
}}

}}

Season 2 (2017–18)

 Critical reception 
The show has received mostly positive reviews.

Jake Howell of The Globe and Mail'' praised the show, commenting "Bickering like a married couple, Matt and Jay's constant back-and-forth enabling, backstabbing and belittling of each other has thus far made for great television."

Notes

References

External links
Official Viceland site

2010s Canadian satirical television series
2017 Canadian television series debuts
Canadian mockumentary television series
Canadian comedy web series
Viceland original programming
Citytv original programming